Boubers-sur-Canche is a commune in the Pas-de-Calais department in the Hauts-de-France region in northern France.

Geography
Boubers-sur-Canche is a farming village located 24 miles (38 km) west of Arras at the junction of the D112 and D340 roads, by the banks of the river Canche. The village wins national and international prizes for its flower display.

Population

Sights
 The church of St. Leger, dating from the seventeenth century.
 An eighteenth-century chateau.
 Public and private gardens.

See also
Communes of the Pas-de-Calais department

References

External links

 Official website of the commune 
 The Hennebellefamily’s gardens and nursery 
 History and photos of the old distillery 
 The camp site 

Communes of Pas-de-Calais